Dasymalla chorisepala is a flowering plant in the mint family Lamiaceae and is endemic to Western Australia and the Northern Territory. It is a small shrub with its branches and leaves densely covered with hairs. The leaves are stalkless, egg-shaped and covered with yellowish hairs while the flowers are small, tube-shaped and white.

Description
The younger branches and leaves are covered with a more yellowish layer of hairs.

The flowers are surrounded by leafy bracts and bracteoles which are covered with glandular hairs, especially on their edges. There are five lobes on the end of the petal tube, the lower one elliptic to almost round in shape and slightly larger than the other four lobes.

Taxonomy and naming
This species was first formally described in 1979 by Ahmad Abid Munir who gave it the name Pityrodia chorisepala and published the description in Journal of the Adelaide Botanic Garden. In 2011, Barry Conn, Murray Henwood and Nicola Streiber resurrected the genus Dasymalla and transferred this species to it as Dasymalla chorisepala. The specific epithet (chorisepala) is derived from the derived from Greek words meaning "separate" and "sepalled".

Distribution
Dasymalla chorisepala occurs in isolated populations in Western Australia and in the Northern Territory near its border with Western Australia. In Western Australia it grows in red sand on dunes and spinifex plains in the Great Sandy Desert biogeographic region and in the Northern Territory south of Mongrel Downs and west of Sandy Blight Junction in the Tanami Desert biogeographic region.<ref name="efloraNT">{{cite web|title=Dasymalla chorisepala|url=http://eflora.nt.gov.au/factsheet?id=5910|publisher=Northern Territy Government: efloraNT|access-date=3 December 2016}}</ref>

ConservationDasymalla chorisepala'' is classified as "Priority Three" by the Government of Western Australia Department of Parks and Wildlife meaning that it is poorly known and known from only a few locations but is not under imminent threat.

References

External links
Dasymalla chorisepala Occurrence data from Australasian Virtual Herbarium

chorisepala
Plants described in 1979
Flora of Western Australia
Flora of the Northern Territory